Hereford Thistle Football Club was a football club based in Hereford, England. Founded in 1885, the club joined the Western League for the 1894–95 season (winning the division title) and moved to the Birmingham & District League the following year, winning the title in the 1896–97 season.

Former players
1. Players that have played/managed in the Football League or any foreign equivalent to this level (i.e. fully professional league).
2. Players with full international caps.
3. Players that hold a club record or have captained the club.
 Harry Crump

References 

Defunct football clubs in England
Association football clubs disestablished in 1899
1899 disestablishments in England
Association football clubs established in 1885
Defunct football clubs in Herefordshire
Hereford